Dan Stav is an Israeli diplomat. He served as Israel's ambassador to Azerbaijan since 31 August 2015 until November 2019.  He served as ambassador to Nepal from 2005 until 2010.

See also
 Israel-Azerbaijan relations

References

External links
 Dan Stav on Azerbaijani media
 Israeli ambassador Dan Stav’s interview to CBC’s FRANKLY SPEAKING analytical program (2016)

Ambassadors of Israel to Azerbaijan
Azerbaijan–Israel relations
Living people
Israeli Jews
Ambassadors of Israel to Nepal
Year of birth missing (living people)